Leigh Daniel Avidan (born March 14, 1979), also known by his stage name Danny Sexbang, is an American musician, Internet personality, comedian, songwriter and actor. He is one half of the musical comedy duo Ninja Sex Party with Brian Wecht, as well as the co-host of the Let's Play webseries Game Grumps with Arin Hanson. He is also part of the more rap-based comedy music trio Starbomb with Hanson and Wecht, and the vocalist for the rock duo Shadow Academy, known for its inspiration from classic novels, alongside Jim Roach.

Early life and education
Avidan was born and raised in Springfield, New Jersey, the elder child of Debra ( Schwartz) and Avigdor Avidan. His father was born and raised in Israel, and served in the Yom Kippur War before immigrating to America where he met Avidan's mother. His younger sister, Dana Avidan Cohn, is the executive style director of PopSugar. His maternal grandfather Bernard Schwartz assisted in inventing the body electrode.

After graduating from Jonathan Dayton High School in 1997, Avidan began pursuing advertising at Boston University in Boston, Massachusetts.

Career

2002–2008: The Northern Hues and Skyhill

In response to a Craigslist ad in late 2002, Avidan joined the indie rock band the Northern Hues, a Philadelphia-based ensemble composed of Aron Brand, Jeff Rains, Alex Yaker, Justin Earley, and Ian Creech. Avidan acted as the group's lead-singer, and wrote most of the band's lyrics, having recently moved to Philadelphia. They released one self-titled EP and one live track recorded in early 2005, at World Cafe Live in Philadelphia. In mid-2005, the band split up; Avidan attributes the separation to personality conflicts and creative differences between the band's members, as well as a collective inability to gain greater recognition and success.

In the winter of 2006, Avidan teamed up with Peter Lennox to form a Brooklyn-based alternative rock duo named Skyhill. Again, Avidan acted as lead-singer and assistant lyricist, and the group released one full album titled Run With the Hunted, on May 16, 2007. They toured New York in early 2008, before eventually separating due to lost passion. On October 7, 2015, Avidan and Lennox returned to release the standalone single "Firefly", which was acclaimed for the band's "maturing in both lyrics and sound" over their previous album. In July 2018, Avidan stated that Skyhill may start new projects in the future, but that nothing was in the works as of then. On October 30, 2020, the group released the single "Howling at the Moon" on YouTube, with an eventual release on streaming services in mid-November of the same year. At the end of 2020, it was announced via the Skyhill website that the band would be working on a new album.

2009–present: Ninja Sex Party

In 2008, Avidan began studying storytelling and improv at the Upright Citizens Brigade Theatre in New York, under the guidance of Zach Woods and Margot Leitman, and had conceptualized the possibility of a new musical project. In need of another band member, Avidan was introduced to Brian Wecht, the musical director of another troupe, by mutual friends at the theatre in early 2009.

Avidan had already chosen the name "Ninja Sex Party," after "everybody's three favorite things," and worked together with Wecht to create characters to represent the band. They eventually settled on "Danny Sexbang" as Avidan's character, and "Ninja Brian" as Wecht's. The duo first gained popularity by performing as a musical guest on Leitman's improvisational comedy show Stripped Stories. Inspired by Tenacious D and Flight of the Conchords, the band is about "a Jewish superhero who wears a unitard, with his best friend, a ninja, and together they sing songs about dicks, and try to hit on women, unsuccessfully." They were also inspired by the work of The Lonely Islands to produce music videos and post them to YouTube.

The group has released several studio albums and singles, many of which have charted on Billboard. As of 2020, they have released five original albums, and three cover albums. On September 17, 2018, the band, along with Tupper Ware Remix Party, performed a censored version of "Danny Don't You Know" on the late-night talk show Conan as a musical guest, making their live television debut.

The band has also appeared in various film festivals, including SXSW, Dragon Con, and the now-defunct LACS.

2013–present: Game Grumps, Starbomb, and other projects

In mid-2013, Jon Jafari left his position as co-host of the Let's Play webseries Game Grumps. Arin Hanson, co-creator of Game Grumps, brought Avidan on to replace Jafari as co-host, after being introduced to Ninja Sex Party's content by fellow animator Ross O'Donovan. Hanson had previously animated part of the band's music video for "Dinosaur Laser Fight" in 2011. Avidan's first appearances on the show had been originally met with a negative response from fans, with the number of dislikes on each consecutive video increasing. However, fans eventually rejected their initial disapproval of a new co-host after witnessing the chemistry between the two hosts, further introducing the Game Grumps channel to more professional content and new audiences.

Avidan would join O'Donovan as co-host of the Game Grumps spin-off show Steam Train, where both hosts play PC games, as opposed to console games. Avidan remained a co-host of the show until its discontinuation. In addition to this, Avidan has acted as a co-host of other shows from the Game Grumps platform, including Grumpcade, Table Flip, and Steam Rolled, as well as providing narration for Hunting Monsters.

In late 2013, Avidan teamed up with Wecht and Hanson to announce a side project band named Starbomb, with Avidan as the lead singer. The band writes parody songs about video games, bringing together the sexually provocative music stylings of Avidan's Ninja Sex Party and the video game-based humor of Hanson. As of 2019, the group has released three albums, all of which have placed on various Billboard charts.

In 2015, Internet personalities Jesse Cox and Michele Morrow began developing an untitled comedy webseries for YouTube Premium, casting Avidan as eSports coach Alex Taylor, alongside Hanson's character, Ryland Smith. After Dan Harmon joined as an executive producer in 2016, the project gained media traction, and was formally announced at VidCon 2017 with the title Good Game. The esports-based series involves Avidan alongside Arin Hanson portraying best friends entering a gaming competition in order to win the grand prize of $1 million. Six serialized episodes were uploaded to the Game Grumps YouTube channel, with the first episode being free-to-view, and concurrent episodes requiring a YouTube Premium subscription. Avidan's performance was very well-received by critics, and was cited as "truly fun, believable", and "shining a light on the potential of other projects."

In late 2021, Avidan announced that he had started a new rock band with fellow musician Jim Roach, named Shadow Academy. Their debut single "White Whale" was officially released alongside a music video on January 28, 2022. On February 25, 2022, they released their second single, "Once and Never More" alongside an animated music video. Their debut album was released on April 22, 2022.

Other ventures
In 2009, Avidan and producer William J. Sullivan collaborated to compose and sell multiple theme and background tracks for various shows while Avidan studied in New York, with clients ranging from Power Rangers RPM to White Collar.

In 2012, Avidan briefly partnered with Mondo Media to host a sketch comedy miniseries called Dirty Shorts, in which Avidan portrayed an exaggerated version of himself, similar to that of Danny Sexbang. The series was not received well, and was dropped after the first 12-episode season. Avidan has commented that the Mondo Media staff experience was welcoming, although he was not confident that the way his character was written would appeal to audiences. Avidan also co-created, co-wrote, and provided voice acting for the studio's short-lived animated comedy miniseries DJs in PJs with Wecht. Avidan returned to Mondo in September 2013 to compose "Dick Figures: The Movie: The Song" for the Dick Figures: The Movie soundtrack with Wecht.

Avidan has appeared on various YouTube webseries as a guest, including Did You Know Gaming?, a webseries dedicated to video game trivia, Good Mythical Morning, a variety show hosted by Rhett and Link, and Nacho Punch, a sketch comedy webseries.

On August 3, 2015, Avidan performed with Steel Panther at their West Hollywood House of Blues venue, singing "Party All Day". The two have collaborated on multiple occasions, with Steel Panther making a cameo in Ninja Sex Party's "Road Trip" music video, and providing vocals for "6969".

Avidan is the co-creator and co-host of the football-centric podcast Balls in Your Ear, along with Josh Sprague.

Avidan, alongside co-creator Kyle Carrozza, performed the theme song for the Cartoon Network series Mighty Magiswords. Avidan also provided the voice of the character Dan in the sixth episode of the second season, "Changeable Terraingable". According to Carrozza, Avidan's take on the character was an impression of his father.

In September 2017, the band Night Runner released an album entitled Thunderbird, which featured Avidan on the fourth track, called "Magnum Bullets". A music video was released in February 2020, with animation from Knights of the Light Table.

In May 2018, Tupper Ware Remix Party released an album entitled Together Through Time, which featured Avidan on the ninth track, called "Starlight Brigade". A music video was released in May 2019, also featuring animation from Knights of the Light Table. The video was aired on Adult Swim's late-night anime block Toonami on August 3, 2019.

On April 17, 2020, Avidan released a collaborative album of acoustic covers together with previous NSP collaborators Super Guitar Bros, titled Dan Avidan & Super Guitar Bros; the first single, a cover of Seal's "Kiss from a Rose", was released earlier that month.

Personal life
Avidan announced his marriage to his girlfriend, Ashley Anderson, on an episode of Game Grumps, which was uploaded on February 2, 2022.

Discography

The Northern Hues
The Northern Hues EP (2004)
World Cafe Live 2005 (2005)

Skyhill
Run with the Hunted (2007)
Firefly (2015)
Howling at the Moon (2020)

Ninja Sex Party

 NSFW (2011)
 Strawberries and Cream (2013)
 Attitude City (2015)
 Under the Covers (2016)
 Under the Covers, Vol. II (2017)
 Cool Patrol (2018)
 Under the Covers, Vol. III (2019)
 The Prophecy (2020)
 Level Up (2021)
 The Very, Very, Very, Very Classy Acoustic Album (2021)

Shadow Academy
 Shadow Academy (2022)

Starbomb
Starbomb (2013)
Player Select (2014)
The TryForce (2019)

Solo
Dan Avidan & Super Guitar Bros (2020)

As a guest
William J. Sullivan – "Backside" (2014)
Kyle Carrozza – "Mighty Magiswords" (2015)
Night Runner – "Magnum Bullets" (2017)
TWRP – "Starlight Brigade" (2018)1
Skyfactor – "A Thousand Sounds" (2018)
 NateWantsToBattle – "My Own Worst Enemy (Lit cover ft. Dan Avidan of Ninja Sex Party)" (2020)
TWRP – "Black Swan" (2020)
TWRP – "The Eve of the War" (2022)

1For Tupper Ware Remix Party songs in which Avidan sang as a member of Ninja Sex Party, see TWRP songs featuring NSP.

Filmography

Film

Television

Web series

As writer

Video games

Awards

See also
List of YouTubers

References

External links

 
 

1979 births
21st-century American male singers
21st-century American singers
American comedy musicians
American tenors
American male voice actors
American people of Israeli descent
Boston University School of Management alumni
Comedians from New Jersey
Comedy YouTubers
Gaming YouTubers
Jewish singers
Jewish American entertainers
Jewish American male comedians
Jewish American musicians
Jonathan Dayton High School alumni
Living people
Music YouTubers
Ninja Sex Party
People from Springfield Township, Union County, New Jersey
Singers from New Jersey
Starbomb members
Video game commentators